Lhao Vo also known as Maru (မရူ) and Langsu, is a Burmish language spoken in Burma and by a few thousand speakers in China.

Distribution
Dai Qingxia (2005:3) reports 5,600 Langsu speakers in China. Many thousands more are dispersed across the eastern edge of Kachin State, Myanmar.
Luxi City: Yingpan Township (ယင်းဖန်မြို့နယ်, 营盘乡)
Lianghe County: Mengyang Township (မယ်ညန့်နယ်, 养乡)
Longchuan County: Bangwai Township (ဖန်ဝိုင်မြို့နယ်, 邦外乡) and Jingkan Township (ကျင်ခန်မြို့နယ်, 景坎乡)

The Langsu people call themselves  (Chinese: Lang'e 浪峨)

Varieties
The standard Lhaovo dialect is that of the Dago’ hill area, on the east side of N'Mai River valley in Kachin State.

Sawada (2017) lists the following patois (subvarieties) of Lhaovo.
Gyanno’: spoken in the west side of the N'Mai River in Sawlaw Township.
Tho’lhang: spoken in Htawlang and a few other villages in northern Sawlaw Township.
Lakin: spoken in Lakin village, northern Sawlaw Township.
Lhangsu (not the same as Langsu 浪速 of Yunnan): spoken in the area between Hkrang Hka and Sanin Hka, which are two tributaries of the Mali Hka.

Langsong
The Langsong (浪宋) are found in Zaoyang (早阳) in Yunlong County (in the Chinese province of Yunnan) as well as in Baocun (表村), Laomo (老末), and Sancha (三岔). They reportedly speak a highly endangered language that may be possibly related to Langsu.

References

Further reading

External links
 Consonant Ear Training and Tones
 Maru fieldwork of John Okell from 1969
 Lhaovo language site

Burmish languages
Languages of Myanmar
Languages of China